Nicholas Hannen may refer to:

Sir Nicholas John Hannen (1842–1900), British lawyer, diplomat and judge
Nicholas Hannen (actor) (1881–1972), his son, British actor